Carol James is a former association football player who represented New Zealand at international level.

James made her Football Ferns début in an 11–0 win over Papua New Guinea on 21 May 1991, and made just one further appearance, in a 0–1 loss to  Australia on 23 May that same year.

References

Year of birth missing (living people)
Living people
New Zealand women's international footballers
New Zealand women's association footballers
Women's association footballers not categorized by position